Basilica of the Sacred Heart may refer to one of several basilicas:

Belgium
 Basilica of the Sacred Heart, Belgium, or "Basilique Nationale du Sacré-Cœur", Brussels

France
 Basilica of the Sacré Cœur or Basilica of the Sacred Heart, Paris

India
 Basilica of the Sacred Heart of Jesus, Pondicherry

New Zealand
 Sacred Heart Basilica, Timaru, a Catholic church in Timaru

Poland
 Basilica of the Sacred Heart of Jesus, Kraków

Portugal
 Estrela Basilica, the first church dedicated to the Sacred Heart of Jesus, Lisbon

United States
 Basilica of the Sacred Heart, Indiana, Notre Dame, Indiana
 Cathedral Basilica of the Sacred Heart, Newark, New Jersey
 Basilica of the Sacred Heart of Jesus, Syracuse, New York
 Basilica of the Sacred Heart of Jesus (Atlanta), Georgia
 Basilica of the Sacred Heart of Jesus, Conewago, Pennsylvania

See also
Sacred Heart Cathedral (disambiguation)
Sacred Heart church (disambiguation)